Collen Smith (born ) is a Namibian rugby union player, currently playing with the Namibia national team and the  in the South African Currie Cup competition. His regular position is tighthead prop.

Rugby career

Smith was born in Germiston, South Africa, but grew up in Windhoek.

References

External links
 

Namibian rugby union players
Living people
1991 births
Rugby union players from Germiston
Rugby union props
Namibia international rugby union players